Olof Hanson (September 10, 1862 – September 8, 1933) was a deaf Swedish architect.

Background
Olof Hanson was born in Fjälkinge, Skåne County, Sweden. His father was a well-to-do farmer, county official, and railroad director. In 1874 the family had made arrangements to go to America, where a farm had been purchased. But his father was taken sick and died, and the trip was postponed till the following year, when they came to the United States and settled near Willmar, Minnesota. Olof lost his hearing two weeks after coming to the country.

Before becoming deaf he attended public schools in Sweden. In 1878 he entered the Minnesota School for the Deaf at Faribault, and graduated in 1881. Then he entered Gallaudet College at Washington and graduated in 1886 at the head of the second largest class in the history of the college up to that time.

Career

After graduating he entered the office of Hodgson & Son, architects, Minneapolis, and remained with this firm in their Minneapolis and Omaha offices until 1889, when he made a trip to Europe for professional study. About ten months were spent abroad, during which he visited England, Scotland, France, Italy, Switzerland, Germany, Denmark, Sweden and Norway. Returning in 1890 he secured a position with Wilson Bros. & Co., Philadelphia, who were then making plans for the new Pennsylvania School for the Deaf at Mt. Airy, and for nearly a year he was engaged on the plans for these extensive buildings.

In 1891 he returned to Minnesota and worked at his profession in Duluth and Minneapolis. For about two years he taught in the school for the deaf at Faribault. But, being resolved to follow his chosen profession of architecture, he opened an office in Faribault, where he has been engaged in business on his own account for about three years. Among the buildings erected from his plans are: The North Dakota School for the Deaf; a boys' dormitory building at the Kendall school, Washington, D. C.; one building for the State School for Feeble-minded at Faribault; residences for Dr. J. L. Noyes, Faribault, for Mr. J. C. Howard, Duluth, and half a dozen others in Faribault and elsewhere; also six brick stores and business blocks in Faribault and other places; and a hotel for the Orinoco company in Venezuela. He engaged on a public school building for the city of Faribault, which was won in competition with about twenty architects.

Hanson's papers were donated to the University Archives of Gallaudet University. Some of his papers are also located at the Rice County Historical Society, Faribault, Minnesota. There is also some other archival information on Hanson at the Northwest Architectural Archives, University of Minnesota. The University of Washington, Department of Special Collections, has material on Hanson related to his work in the UW Department of Buildings and Grounds.

Hanson served as President of the National Association of the Deaf of the United States (NAD) from 1910 to 1913.

Personal life
Olof Hanson married Agatha Tiegel whom he had met at the Minnesota Institute for the Deaf, where she was a deaf teacher. Agatha Tiegel was the first female graduate of Gallaudet University's full program, with a B.A. in 1893. Together they were the parents of three daughters:
Marion F. (born c. 1901 in MN), Alice C. (born c. 1905 in WA) and Helen (born c. 1907 in WA).

See also 

 List of American architects

References

Other sources
Anderson, Dennis; Dietz, Duane; Ochsner, Jeffrey, Karl  Shaping Seattle Architecture	(University of Washington Press. 1994)

Biographical information
Biographical information was quoted from the public domain book: Representative Deaf Persons of the United States of America (ed. by James E. Gallager, 1898, pp. 109–112) ''

External links
 Gallaudet Alumni cards

1862 births
1933 deaths
People from Kristianstad Municipality
Swedish emigrants to the United States
Gallaudet University alumni
American deaf people